Durgapur may refer to: 

 Durgapur, West Bengal, a city in West Bengal, India
 Durgapur subdivision, the subdivision in which the aforementioned city is located
 Durgapur Barrage, across the Damodar River
 Durgapur Purba (Vidhan Sabha constituency)
 Durgapur Paschim (Vidhan Sabha constituency)
 Durgapur (Lok Sabha constituency) - now defunct
 Bardhaman-Durgapur (Lok Sabha constituency)
 Durgapur, Angul, a village in Orissa, India
 Durgapur, Netrokona Bangladesh
 Durgapur, Rajshahi Bangladesh
 Durgapur, Maharashtra
 Durgapur, Nepal